Slovakia was represented by 19 athletes at the 2010 European Athletics Championships held in  Barcelona, Spain, from 27 July to 1 August 2010.

Participants

Results

References 
 Participants list (men)
 Participants list (women)

Nations at the 2010 European Athletics Championships
2010
European Athletics Championships